Guerino is both an Italian given name and a surname. Notable people with the name include:

Given names
Guerino Bertocchi (1907-1981), Italian mechanic and racing driver
Guerino Capretti (born 1982), German footballer
Guerino Gottardi (born 1970), Italian-Swiss footballer
Guerino Minervino Neto (born 1950), Brazilian footballer
Guerino Mazzola (born 1947), Swiss mathematician
Guerino Petronelli (1923-2012), American boxing trainer

Middle names
Joseph Guerino Tripodi (born 1967), Australian politician
Renato Guerino Turano (1942-2021), Italian-American politician and businessman

See also
Guerino Vanoli Basket, an Italian professional basketball team

Italian masculine given names